Liometopum orientale is a species of ant in the genus Liometopum. Described by Karavaiev in 1927, the species is endemic to the Russian Federation and North Korea.

References

Dolichoderinae
Insects described in 1927
Hymenoptera of Europe
Hymenoptera of Asia